The 1977 Pittsburgh Panthers football team represented the University of Pittsburgh in the 1977 NCAA Division I football season. The Panthers competed in the Gator Bowl.

Schedule

Personnel

Season summary

Notre Dame

Team players drafted into the NFL

References

Pittsburgh
Pittsburgh Panthers football seasons
Gator Bowl champion seasons
Pittsburgh Panthers football